Charles "Pat" Dougherty (October 26, 1879 – July 12, 1939) was a Negro leagues pitcher for several years before the founding of the first Negro National League.

Sportswriter and fellow player Jimmy Smith put Dougherty on his 1909 "All American Team."

Dougherty died at the age of 59 in Chicago, Illinois. He is buried at Lincoln Cemetery at Blue Island, Illinois.

References

External links

Leland Giants players
Chicago American Giants players
1879 births
1939 deaths
20th-century African-American people